Mount Sannine ( / ALA-LC: Jabal Șannīn) is a mountain in the Mount Lebanon range. Its highest point is 2,628 m (8,622 feet) above sea level in Lebanon.  Mount Sannine, which has a base of limestone, is the source of many mountain springs.

See also 
 Sannine Zenith Lebanon
 Lebanon

References

External links 
 Panorama photo of Mount Sannine

Sannine
Tourist attractions in Lebanon